The Chief Justice of Zimbabwe is the chief judge of the Supreme Court of Zimbabwe. As such, he is head of the Zimbabwe judiciary.

Per Section 168 of the Zimbabwean Constitution, the Chief Justice is assisted by a Deputy Chief Justice and no fewer than two other associate justices. The Chief Justice leads the business of the Supreme Court and presides over oral arguments. He is also the most senior of the three members of the Zimbabwe Court of Appeals. The Chief Justice also administers the oath of office to the President of Zimbabwe. Like other Supreme Court justices, he is obligated to retire at age 70.

Since the court was established in 1927, 14 men have served as Chief Justice. This includes eight chief justices during the Southern Rhodesia and Rhodesia periods. The first Chief Justice was Sir Murray Bisset. Since Zimbabwe's independence in 1980, six men have served as Chief Justice. Of these six, three have been White and three Black. The current Chief Justice since 2021 is Luke Malaba.

History of the office

Duties

Oath of office

List

Chief Justices of Southern Rhodesia

Chief Justices of Rhodesia

Chief Justices of Zimbabwe

See also 

 List of justices of the Supreme Court of Zimbabwe

References 

Zimbabwe
Judiciary of Zimbabwe